The spokesperson for the Ministry of Foreign Affairs of the People's Republic of China is director of the Information Department or one of his deputies.

References